"Touching Home" is a song written by Dallas Frazier and A.L. Owens and originally recorded by Jerry Lee Lewis for his Mercury Records' album of the same name (1971). It was also released as a single [with "Woman, Woman (Get Out of Our Way)" from  Mercury's album There Must Be More to Love Than This on the flip side], reaching number 5 on the Cash Box Country Singles chart and number 3 on the Billboard country chart.

Track listing

Charts

See also 
 Touching Home (album)#Recording

References 

1970 songs
1970 singles
Jerry Lee Lewis songs
Smash Records singles
American country music songs